William Beaw  (1616-1706), sometimes spelled Beau, was Bishop of Llandaff from 1679 until his death.

Beaw was educated at New College, Oxford. During the English Civil War he was a Major of a regiment of horse for Charles I. He also served  Sweden in their war with Poland. In 1661 he became Vicar of Adderbury, a post he held until his elevation to the episcopate.

Beaw had a daughter, Jane, who married John Arundell, 3rd Baron Arundell of Trerice.  Her will was proved 14 Jul 1744.

Notes

1616 births
1706 deaths
People from Newbury, Berkshire
Alumni of New College, Oxford
Bishops of Llandaff
18th-century Welsh Anglican bishops
17th-century Welsh Anglican bishops